Stratonicea or Stratonikeia, also Stratoniki or Stratonice (Στρατονίκη), was a town of Chalcidice in ancient Macedonia. It was a Hellenistic foundation on the west coast of the Akte peninsula (now Mount Athos), a few kilometers northwest of Cleonae. According to Claudius Ptolemy, the city was located on the Singitic Gulf.

Its site is unlocated.

References

Sources

Hazlitt's Classical Gazetteer
Blue Guide, Greece, p. 599

Hellenistic colonies in Chalcidice
Antigonid colonies in Macedonia
Populated places in ancient Macedonia
Former populated places in Greece
Lost ancient cities and towns
Populated places in Chalkidiki